Theocolax is a parasitic wasp genus in the family Pteromalidae.

Species list 
 Theocolax bakeri (Crawford, 1915)
 Theocolax elegans (Westwood, 1874)
 Theocolax formiciformis (Westwood, 1832)
 Theocolax frater (Girault, 1913)
 Theocolax ingens (Xiao & Huang, 2001)
 Theocolax oblonga (Delucchi 1956)
 Theocolax phloeosini (Yang, 1989)
 Theocolax radhakrishnani (Sureshan & Narendran, 2005)

References

External links 

 http://www.bioone.org/doi/abs/10.4289/0013-8797.117.2.162

Pteromalidae